Adam Bysouth (born January 4, 1979) is a Canadian lacrosse coach and former player in the National Lacrosse League.  Bysouth is currently the head coach for the Serra High School Varsity Lacrosse Program.

Bysouth was born in Abbotsford, British Columbia.

Statistics

NLL

References

1979 births
Living people
Calgary Roughnecks players
Canadian lacrosse players
Portland LumberJax players
Sportspeople from British Columbia